Susan Bell McGahey (1862 - November 16, 1919) was the matron of the Royal Prince Alfred Hospital from 1891 to 1904. McGahey was also co-founder of the Australasian Trained Nurses' Association in 1899 and president of the International Council of Nurses from 1904 to 1909.

Early life and education
Susan Bell McGahey was born in 1862 in Stewartstown, Ireland.  She was partially homeschooled before attending a college in Belfast where she received multiple awards and scholarships. After moving to England in the 1870s, McGahey completed her nursing training at The London Hospital in 1887. with an additional certificate at the Obstetrical Society of London.

Career
After receiving additional nursing training, McGahey began her nursing career at The London Hospital in 1884. She worked at the hospital as a student nurse for five years before moving to Australia. Upon arriving in Australia in 1890, McGahey became a matron at Carrington Convalescent Hospital in Camden, New South Wales. The following year, she replaced Catherine C. Downs as matron of the Royal Prince Alfred Hospital in 1891. As matron, she introduced recommendations about the training and hiring of nurses in New South Wales. In 1904, she resigned from the RPAH and opened a training hospital for nurses.

Outside of her career as a matron, McGahey was a co-founder of the Australasian Trained Nurses' Association in 1899. During her time at the ATNA, McGahey was elected president of the International Council of Nurses in 1904. She remained at the ATNA as a secretary until 1912.

Death
McGahey died from cancer on 16 November 1919 in Carlingford, New South Wales, Australia.

References

1862 births
1919 deaths
Nurses from Northern Ireland
Deaths from cancer in New South Wales
19th-century Australian women
20th-century Australian women